A  (also /) is a small long-handled pot with a pouring lip designed specifically to make Turkish coffee. It is traditionally made of brass or copper, occasionally also silver or gold. In more recent times  are also made from stainless steel, aluminium, or ceramics.

Name

Modern Persian ), from Middle Persian , ultimately from Old Persian  'water' +  'pour' (cf. Modern Persian and Middle Persian  []).

Variations 

Gallery

See also

 Dallah (Arabic coffee pot)
 Jebena (Ethiopian coffee pot)
 Arabic coffee
 Turkish coffee
 List of cooking vessels

References

Sources 
 alt.coffee thread archive regarding cezve word origin
 Comech's cezve page at tamu.edu

Cooking vessels
Coffee preparation
Turkish words and phrases
Coffee culture in Bosnia and Herzegovina
Food and drink in Turkey